Sundaresa Desikar is a spiritual writer. He was born to a Tamil-speaking Desikar family from Mailam and settled down at Valavanur, Tamil Nadu.

Family background 

Sundaresa Desikar was born to Velaiyar and Meenatchi Ammal in a village called Mailam near by Tindivanam in Tamil Nadu, South India into an orthodox Saiva Tamil Desikar family around the middle of the 18th century.

Sundaresa Desikar's father Velaiyar was a respectable spiritual leader and a great Tamil poet.

Kumara Swamy Desikar was his Great Grand father. Siva Prakasar and Karunai Prakasar were Sundaresanar's uncles. Gnambikai Ammal wife of Santhalinga Swamigal is Sundaresanar's aunt.

Siva Prakasar, his uncle, the real poet was blessed as ‘Sivanuputhichelvar’ by the Pommapuram Aatheenam Swamigal. He is acclaimed as ‘Karpanai Kalangiyam’ by renowned scholars. He compiled " Neerotta amaha Anthathi " to defeat the arrogant Poet. And also written " Yesu Matha Niragaranam " (The Refuting the Religion of Jesus) against Christianity. He attain mukthi motcha at his 32 age in Nallathur near Pondichery.

His aunt  Gnambikai married Perur Santhalinga Swamigal.

Younger uncle Karunai Prakasar get married and wrote more than five books in Tamil. "Seegalathi sarukkam, Ishtalinga Agaval"... He died at Thiruvengai.

Velaiyar, father of Sundaresanar wrote more than seven books. "Mayilathula, Nallur puranam, Mayilai thirattai mani maalai, Ishta linga kaithala maalai, Kumbakona Sarangathevar history as Veera singhathana puranam, Gugai Namachivaya Desikar history as Namchivaya leelai and Krisnanan history as Paarijatha leelai".
And attain mukthi motcha in Perumathur at the age of seventy-two.

Sundaresanar married Karpagammal. He settled down his family in Valavanur. They got a son and named him Swaminatha Desikar. Swaminatha Desikar converted himself to Christianity around 1884, changed his name to Susai alias Swaminatha Desikar and married Gnasounthari.

Early life
Sundaresa Desikar learnt all sort of arts. He became a philosopher as well as a very good sculptor i.e. sthapathy.

End of life
He died in Valavanur at the age of 61.

Writings
He compiled and preserved all of his forefather's writings and handed over most of the books to the Mailam Pommapuram Aadeenam mutt.

References

1817 births
1878 deaths
Indian Shaivite religious leaders
People from Tamil Nadu
19th-century Hindu religious leaders